Victor Skutezky (15 January 1893 – 1981) was a British film producer, writer and production manager.

He was a key filmmaker at Associated British Picture Corporation where he was a staff producer then had his own production company, Marble Arch Films.

Selected filmography
 The Call of the North (1929)
 Sinful and Sweet (1929)
 The Man Without Love  (1929)
 Daughter of the Regiment (1929)
It Happened One Sunday (1944) – screenplay
Quiet Weekend (1946) – screenplay, producer
Temptation Harbour (1947) – producer
Landfall (1949) – producer
For Them That Trespass (1949) – producer
Murder without Crime (1951) – producer
Young Wives' Tale (1951) – producer
Father's Doing Fine (1952) – producer
The Yellow Balloon (1953) – producer
The Weak and the Wicked (1954) – producer
It's Great to be Young! (1956) – producer
Alive and Kicking (1958) – producer

References

External links

Victor Skutezky at BFI

1893 births
1981 deaths
British film producers